The Soto Zen Buddhist Association was formed in 1996 by American and Japanese Zen teachers in response to a perceived need to draw the various autonomous lineages of the North American Sōtō stream of Zen together for mutual support as well as the development of common training and ethical standards. With about one hundred fully transmitted priests, the SZBA now includes members from most of the Japanese-derived Sōtō Zen lineages in North America. The founding president was Tetsugen Bernard Glassman, followed by Sojun Mel Weitsman, Myogen Steve Stucky, Jishō Warner (the first female president), and Eido Frances Carney.

The Soto Zen Buddhist Association approved a document honoring the women ancestors in the Zen tradition at its biannual meeting on October 8, 2010. Female ancestors, dating back 2,500 years from India, China, and Japan, are now being more regularly included in the curriculum, ritual, and training offered to Western Zen students.

See also
Zenshuji Soto Misson
American Zen Teachers Association

References

External links
Soto Zen Buddhist Association homepage

Buddhist organizations based in the United States
Soto Zen